Blue aster is a common name for several flowering plants in the aster family Asteraceae and may refer to:

Symphyotrichum laeve, smooth blue aster
Symphyotrichum oolentangiense (syn. Aster azureus), sky blue aster